Bob Heatlie (born 1946) is a Scottish songwriter and record producer who has collaborated with many music acts, both bands and solo artists. He has also been successful in producing musical scores of television entertainment series.

Biography

Early life 
Born in 1946 in Craigmillar, in Edinburgh, Scotland, he started learning the saxophone from his father when he was six years old. He later played drums in his father's band.

Chart hit songs 
His most successful and prominent songs are "Japanese Boy" and "Merry Christmas Everyone", both substantial 1980s pop chart hits across Europe and beyond: the first being a 1981 novelty hit, recorded by Scottish singer Aneka and released by the German record label Hansa, while the latter being a 1985-released Christmas hit, recorded by Welsh artist Shakin' Stevens. This last song reached no. 1 of the chart that year, and has since then become an annual mainstay of radio airplay in and around the December holidays. This song was written by Heatlie in the middle of a heatwave during the summer.

Heatlie wrote the songs "Cry Just A Little Bit" (1983) and "Breaking Up My Heart" (1985) for Shakin' Stevens. Heatlie also wrote another track for Stevens entitled "Woman (What Have You Done To Me)", included on the recording artist 1988 album "A Whole Lotta Shaky". Heatlie also co-produced and remixed nine songs on this Stevens' album. A remixed version of the same song was featured in Stevens' 2009 release "The Epic Masters Box Set". The last single Bob Heatlie worked on with Shakin' Stevens was "Radio", which was released in 1992 and featured Roger Taylor from Queen.

Current status 
In later years, Heatlie has concentrated on creating musical compositions for children's television. He also composed the music for the documentary series Worlds Apart and the television special The Curious Case of Santa Claus.

Personal life 
One of the partners of Bob Heatlie was Hungarian singer Eva Csepregi, lead vocalist of disco band Neoton Família. Heatlie produced her solo albums from 1985 to 1992, which were released in Europe and South Korea and were popular in Soviet Union and in Asia generally. In 1992, Eva and Bob Heatlie had a son, David.

Songwriting credits

Solo 
Aneka – "Japanese Boy" (single, 8 August 1981, UK No. 1)
Cliff Richard – "Locked Inside Your Prison" (album track on Silver, October 1983, UK No. 7)
Shakin' Stevens – "Cry Just a Little Bit" (single, 5 November 1983, UK No. 3)
Shakin' Stevens – "Breaking Up My Heart" (single, 2 March 1985, UK No. 14)
Shakin' Stevens – "Merry Christmas Everyone" (single, 7 December 1985, UK No. 1)
Ann Turner – "Too Hot to Handle" (runner-up in the UK's Song For Europe Eurovision Song Contest selection TV programme, 1987)
Shakin' Stevens – "Woman (What Have You Done to Me)" (album track on "A Whole Lotta Shaky" 1988)

With Gordon Campbell 
Local Hero – "Why Don't You" (B-side to the single "Daydream Believer")
Anya – "Moscow Nights" (single, 1985)
Shakin' Stevens – "Radio" (single, 10 October 1992, UK No. 37)

For TV 
 
Professor Bubble theme tune.
The Trap Door theme tune - vocals performed by Zygott.
Little Robots (2003–2005)
Kipper (1997–2000)
Bob the Builder (1997 pilot)
Sheeep (2000)
Anthony Ant (1999)
Percy the Park Keeper (1996–1999)

 Composed with David Pringle
Fun House theme tune
Wheel of Fortune theme tune (title "Spin And Win",  published by KPM)

References

External links 

Official Shakin' Stevens website

1946 births
Living people
Scottish songwriters
Scottish record producers
Musicians from Edinburgh